Stefano Coletti (born 6 April 1989) is a Monégasque professional racing driver who races for SMP Racing in the European Le Mans Series. His sister Alexandra Coletti is an alpine skier. He is the first Monégasque driver since Louis Chiron (1931) to have won a race in Monaco.

Career

Karting
Born in La Colle, Monaco, Coletti enjoyed a successful karting career prior to moving into single-seater racing. In 2003, he finished as runner-up in the Italian Open Masters ICA–Junior category before winning the Andrea Margutti Trophy and European Championship ICA–Junior titles in 2004.

Formula BMW
In 2005, Coletti moved up to Formula racing, joining Eifelland Racing to contest the Formula BMW ADAC championship, where he finished eighteenth in the standings. He also took part in the Formula BMW World Final in Bahrain for ASL Team Mücke Motorsport, finishing in twenty-fifth place.

He continued in the championship in 2006, taking four podium places, including a single victory, to finish seventh in the standings. He also took part in four Formula BMW USA races, winning three of them to finish the season in fifth place, despite missing a large proportion of the championship. Coletti once again competed in the Formula BMW World Final, held at the Circuit Ricardo Tormo, where he finished in third place, behind Mika Mäki and race winner Christian Vietoris.

Formula Renault
In August 2006, Coletti made his debut in the Eurocup Formula Renault 2.0 series, driving for the Cram Competition and Motopark Academy teams, although he failed to score a point in any of the six races he entered.

In 2007, he joined the Spanish Epsilon Euskadi team to contest both the Eurocup and Italian Formula Renault 2.0 championships. He finished fourth in the Eurocup standings after taking a win at the Hungaroring and two further podium places, whilst in the Italian series he took two victories – both at Misano – to finish in tenth place.

Formula Three

Coletti moved up to the Formula 3 Euro Series for the 2008 season, joining the French Signature-Plus team. However, he left the team after the first four races after being dropped from the Red Bull Driver Development scheme. Coletti missed the next round of the series at Pau before joining Prema Powerteam, who he remained with for the rest of the season. He took a best race result of fourth to finish the year in twentieth position. He also took part in the Masters of Formula 3 and Macau Grand Prix non-championship races, but retired from both events.

In January 2009, Prema announced that Coletti would be staying with the team for the 2009 season. At the first round of the year in Hockenheim, Coletti qualified on the front row of the grid before going on to win the opening race of the season. The following month, Coletti took part in the Masters of Formula 3 event held at Zandvoort, qualifying in fourth position before finishing the race in third place, behind Finns Mika Mäki and race winner Valtteri Bottas.

Coletti was involved in a controversial incident after the first race at the Norisring. Having finished third to move into third in the championship, Coletti had an altercation with race winner Jules Bianchi. Coletti felt that Bianchi had said "bad words" to him, and struck the ART Grand Prix driver and championship leader. Coletti was then stripped of his third place, and was excluded from the rest of the meeting. Coletti failed to score points after the Oschersleben rounds, and finished tenth in the championship.

Formula Renault 3.5 Series
In November 2008, Coletti sampled Formula Renault 3.5 Series machinery for the first time, testing for RC Motorsport at Valencia alongside former GP2 Series driver Andy Soucek. On 15 May 2009 it was announced that Coletti would race for Prema Powerteam in the Monaco round of the 2009 Formula Renault 3.5 Series, replacing Frankie Provenzano. He originally finished in eleventh place, but after Marco Barba received a 25-second penalty, Coletti was promoted into the final points paying position in tenth.

Coletti returned to the series for a full season in 2010, driving alongside Greg Mansell at Comtec Racing. He took five podium finishes on his way to sixth place in the championship.

GP3 Series
Coletti also contested fourteen races of the inaugural GP3 Series season for the Tech 1 Racing team, replacing Daniel Juncadella after the first round of the championship.  His team-mates were variously Doru Sechelariu, Jean-Éric Vergne, Jim Pla and the returning Juncadella. Coletti finished the year ninth in the championship; the best-placed of the Tech 1 drivers.

GP2 Series

Coletti made his GP2 debut in 2009 at Valencia when he replaced Davide Valsecchi at Durango. He suffered a fraught first meeting in the series, receiving three drive-through penalties. In race one he received one for jumping the start and one for crossing the white line at the pit lane exit, before retiring from the race. In race two he stalled on the grid and was penalised for starting from the grid instead of the pitlane; he collided with Dani Clos before taking this penalty. In his third GP2 race, at the Circuit de Spa-Francorchamps, Coletti crashed heavily with two laps remaining causing the race to finish under safety car conditions. He escaped with compressed vertebrae and minor bruising, missing the following day's sprint race as his car's monocoque was written off by the impact. He also missed the Brands Hatch rounds of the F3 Euroseries due to his injury. He was due to return to GP2 at Monza having originally been passed fit, but pulled out due to recurring pain during Thursday scrutineering.

Coletti returned to GP2 in 2011, driving for Trident Racing alongside Rodolfo González. In the Asia series, he scored a victory in the sprint race at Yas Marina on his way to fourth place in the drivers' standings. He also began the main series strongly, winning the sprint race of the first round of the championship, held at Istanbul Park. After winning the sprint race in Hungary, he crashed heavily during the feature race at Spa-Francorchamps and sustained two vertebral compression fractures, two years after sustaining a similar, but more minor injury. He missed the rest of the season as a result. His seat was taken by compatriot Stéphane Richelmi.

His injury healed, Coletti returned to GP2 for the 2012 season with Scuderia Coloni, alongside Fabio Onidi, but after ten rounds of the championship, lying only 14th in the championship with one podium finish, he left the team by mutual consent. He promptly joined the Rapax team for the final rounds of the championship, replacing Daniël de Jong. He finished in the points in three of the remaining four races, moving him above Rio Haryanto into a final championship position of 13th.

Racing record

Career summary

* Season still in progress.

Complete Formula 3 Euro Series results
(key) (Races in bold indicate pole position) (Races in italics indicate fastest lap)

Complete Macau Grand Prix results

Complete Formula Renault 3.5 Series results
(key) (Races in bold indicate pole position) (Races in italics indicate fastest lap)

Complete GP2 Series results
(key) (Races in bold indicate pole position; races in italics indicate fastest lap)

† Driver did not finish the race, but was classified as he completed over 90% of the race distance.

Complete GP2 Asia Series results
(key) (Races in bold indicate pole position) (Races in italics indicate fastest lap)

Complete GP2 Final results
(key) (Races in bold indicate pole position) (Races in italics indicate fastest lap)

Complete GP3 Series results
(key) (Races in bold indicate pole position) (Races in italics indicate fastest lap)

Complete IndyCar Series results
(key) (Races in bold indicate pole position; races in italics indicate fastest lap)

Complete European Le Mans Series results
(key) (Races in bold indicate pole position) (Races in italics indicate fastest lap)

Complete FIA Formula 2 Championship results
(key) (Races in bold indicate pole position) (Races in italics indicate points for the fastest lap of top ten finishers)

References

External links

 
 

1989 births
Living people
Monegasque people of Italian descent
Monegasque racing drivers
Formula BMW ADAC drivers
Formula BMW USA drivers
Formula Renault Eurocup drivers
Italian Formula Renault 2.0 drivers
Formula 3 Euro Series drivers
A1 Grand Prix Rookie drivers
GP2 Series drivers
GP3 Series drivers
World Series Formula V8 3.5 drivers
GP2 Asia Series drivers
FIA Formula 3 European Championship drivers
IndyCar Series drivers
Indianapolis 500 drivers
European Le Mans Series drivers
FIA Formula 2 Championship drivers
Eifelland Racing drivers
Mücke Motorsport drivers
Cram Competition drivers
Motopark Academy drivers
EuroInternational drivers
Epsilon Euskadi drivers
Signature Team drivers
Prema Powerteam drivers
Durango drivers
Comtec Racing drivers
Tech 1 Racing drivers
Charouz Racing System drivers
Trident Racing drivers
Scuderia Coloni drivers
Rapax Team drivers
Racing Engineering drivers
KV Racing Technology drivers
SMP Racing drivers
Campos Racing drivers
Team Lazarus drivers
Ma-con Motorsport drivers
Starworks Motorsport drivers